Thyrassia subcordata is a moth in the family Zygaenidae. It was described by Francis Walker in 1854 from Sri Lanka. One subspecies is recorded, Thyrassia subcordata aurodisca Hampson, 1891.

References

Moths described in 1854